Panggih Prio Sembodho (born 3 March 1998) is an Indonesian professional footballer who plays as a goalkeeper for Liga 1 club Bhayangkara.

Career statistics

Club

Honours

International 
Indonesia U16
 AFF U-16 Youth Championship runner-up: 2013

References

External links

1998 births
Living people
Sportspeople from Medan
Sportspeople from North Sumatra
Liga 1 (Indonesia) players
Madura United F.C. players
Bhayangkara F.C. players
Persipura Jayapura players
Indonesia youth international footballers
Association football goalkeepers
Indonesian footballers
21st-century Indonesian people